At the 1995 Military World Games, the track and field events were held at the Stadio Olimpico in Rome, Italy in September 1995. A total of thirty events were contested, of which 22 by male and 8 by female athletes.

Russia easily topped the medal table with ten golds among its total of nineteen medals, including particular success in the women's events where the nation won six of the eight available. The host nation, Italy, was the next most successful with four medals of each colour. It was closely followed by two other nations with twelve medals: Kenya (also four golds) and Ukraine (three golds and six silvers). Twenty countries reached the medal table in the athletics programme. Twelve new CISM records were set, covering athletics events between military athletes.

Dino Napier of the United States was the most successful athlete of the tournament, being the only multiple individual medallist with his 200 metres gold medal and 400 metres silver. High-profile athletes at the competition included Paul Tergat (World Cross Country champion that year), Ismael Kirui (who repeated his 5000 m world championships win a month earlier), the 20 km race walk world champion Michele Didoni, pole vault world medallist Jean Galfione and javelin world medallist Boris Henry. Polish racewalker Robert Korzeniowski—silver medallist here—went on to win four Olympic gold medals.

Medal summary

Men

Women

Medal table

References

Results
Military World Games. GBR Athletics. Retrieved on 2014-11-17.
1st Military World Games - 1995 Results (archived). CISM. Retrieved on 2014-11-21.

1995
Military World Games
1995 Military World Games
Track and field
1995 Military World Games